Paul Griffiths (born 14 September 1975 in Wolverhampton) is an English former cricketer active from 2000 to 2001 who played for Leicestershire. He appeared in two first-class matches as a righthanded batsman who bowled right arm medium fast. He scored five runs with a highest score of 4* and took three wickets with a best performance of two for 51.

Notes

1975 births
English cricketers
Leicestershire cricketers
Living people